Lativka (Ukrainian:Латівка) is a village in, Odesa Raion, Odesa Oblast, Ukraine. It belongs to Usatove rural hromada, one of the hromadas of Ukraine, and is one of 15 villages of the hromada. Lativka has a population of 1954 (As of 2001 population census). It is one of four villages in the hromada which had a former name.

Until 18 July 2020, Lativka belonged to Biliaivka Raion. The raion was abolished in July 2020 as part of the administrative reform of Ukraine, which reduced the number of raions of Odesa Oblast to seven. The area of Biliaivka Raion was merged into Odesa Raion.

Population census 
As of January 12, 1989, Lativka had a population of 1,673, consisting of 747 men and 926 women. By December 5, 2001, Lativka had a population of 1,954, an increase of 281.

See also 
 Ivan Zhevakhov

References 

Villages in Odesa Raion
Usatove Hromada